The 1980 Los Angeles Rams season was the team's 43rd year with the National Football League (NFL), the 35th season in Los Angeles, and the first season at Anaheim Stadium. The Rams improved from their 9-7 Super Bowl season from the previous year with an 11-5 record. They made the playoffs for the 8th straight season. Coming off a Super Bowl appearance the previous season, the Rams had high hopes of winning the championship for the first time. After a slow start to the season, the Rams caught fire and won five games in a row to sit at 5-2. In week 15, the Rams hosted the Dallas Cowboys on Monday Night Football. In a highly anticipated matchup, the Rams wound up crushing the Cowboys 38-14. This win clinched a playoff berth for the Rams for the 8th straight season, still a team record. However, they couldn't beat Dallas when it mattered, losing at Texas Stadium in the Wild Card game 34-13. Because the Steelers missed the playoffs for the first time since 1971, the Rams were the only team from 1973 to this year that never missed the playoffs.

Offseason

NFL Draft

Personnel

Staff

Roster

Regular season

Schedule

Season summary

Week 1 vs Lions

Playoffs

Standings

See also 
Other Anaheim–based teams in 1980
 1980 California Angels season

References 

/*https://www.newspapers.com/clip/66363663/*/

External links 
 1980 Los Angeles Rams at Pro-Football-Reference.com

 

Los Angeles Rams
Los Angeles Rams seasons
Los Ang